Mean Dog Blues is a 1978 American drama film directed by Mel Stuart. It stars Gregg Henry and Kay Lenz.

Plot
After hitchhiking a car ride with a drunken politician and his seductive wife, Paul Ramsey, a singer, offers to take the rap in court when the politician seriously injures a child while under the influence, only to be double-crossed and sentenced to five years in prison. He ends up with other inmates treated sadistically by a brutal prison official who makes them train his hunting dogs including Rattler, a vicious Doberman.

Cast
Gregg Henry as Paul Ramsey
Kay Lenz as Linda Ramsey
George Kennedy as Captain Omar Kinsman
Scatman Crothers as Mudcat
Tina Louise as Donna Lacey
Felton Perry as Jake Turner
Gregory Sierra as Jesus Gonzales
James Wainwright as Sergeant Wacker
William Windom as Victor Lacey

References

External links

1978 films
1978 drama films
1970s prison drama films
American drama films
American prison films
1970s English-language films
Films directed by Mel Stuart
Films scored by Fred Karlin
1970s American films